The Illustrious Order of Loyalty to Sultan 'Abdu'l Halim Mu'azzam Shah (Bahasa Melayu: Darjah Yang Mulia Sri Setia Sultan 'Abdu'l Halim Mu'azzam Shah)  is an honorific order of the Sultanate of Kedah

History 
It was founded by Sultan Abdul Halim of Kedah on 15 July 1983 in three classes. A further and upper class was added in 2008 : Grand Commander or Darjah Seri Setia Sultan 'Abdu'l Halim Mu'azzam Shah - SHMS.

Classes 
It is awarded in four classes: 
 Grand Commander or Darjah Seri Setia Sultan 'Abdu'l Halim Mu'azzam Shah - SHMS
 The male titular has right to the prefix Dato' Seri Diraja and his wife, to the prefix Datin Seri Diraja
 Knight Commander or Datuk Sri Paduka Sultan 'Abdu'l Halim Mu'azzam Shah - DHMS
 The male titular has right to the prefix Dato' Paduka' and his wife, to the prefix Datin Paduka
 Companion or Setia Sultan 'Abdu'l Halim Mu'azzam Shah - SMS
 Star or Bintang Setia Sultan 'Abdu'l Halim Mu'azzam Shah - BMS

Award conditions 
 Knight Commander or Datuk Sri Paduka - DHMS  The Order is conferred on those in high positions who have performed meritorious services to the State and Nation. Its recipients are dubbed with the title, "Dato' Paduka"

Insignia 
 Grand Commander (SHMS) . The insignia is composed of a collar, a badge hanging from a sash and a breast star (Photo). 
 Knight Commander (DHMS). The insignia is composed of a badge hanging from a sash and a breast star (Photo ).
 Companion (SMS) The insignia is composed of a badge hanging from a collar sash for a male titular (Photo) and from a breast knot for a female titular (Photo ).
 Star (BMS). The insignia is composed of a badge hanging from a ribbon (Photo ).

Notable recipients 

Sultan Abdul Halim of Kedah: 
  Founding Grand Master of the Order of Sultan 'Abdu'l Halim Mu'azzam Shah (SHMS, since 2008)
  Knight Commander (DHMS) and Founding Grand Master of the Order of Loyalty to Sultan 'Abdu'l Halim Mu'azzam Shah (DHMS-SMS-BMS, since 15 July 1983)

Members of the Royal Family of Kedah : 

  Grand Commande of the Order with title : Dato' Sri :
 Princess Intan Safinaz DKH SSDK SHMS PSM JP PAT (Sultan Abdul Halim of Kedah and Tuanku Bahiyah's daughter and Mbr of the Regency Council 2011) (SHMS, 12.12.2011) 
 Princess Soraya SSDK SHMS (Sultan Abdul Halim of Kedah and Tuanku Bahiyah's adoptive daughter) (SHMS, 17.7.2008)  
 Tunku Sallehuddin, Tunku Paduka Maharaja Temenggong Angota Desa PSM SSDK SHMS BCK PAT (3rd ygr br. of the Sultan and Mbr of the Regency Council 2011) (SHMS, 17.7.2008) 
 Tunku Abdul Hamid Thani, Tunku Laksamana SSDK SHMS  (4th younger brother of the Sultan and member of the Regency Council 2011) (SHMS, 17.7.2008):
  Companion of the Order :
 Tunku Hamidah  SPMK SSDK SMS (eldest daughter of Sultan Badlishah of Kedah)  (SMS)
 Tunku Bisharah DSDK SMS (4th daughter of Sultan Badlishah of Kedah) (SMS)
 Tunku Nafisah DSDK SMS (7th daughter of Sultan Badlishah of Kedah) (SMS, 21.1.2002)

Lists of recipients 
 List of honours of the Kedah Royal Family by country
 List of Honours of Kedah awarded to Heads of State and Royals

References 

Loyalty to Sultan 'Abdu'l Halim Mu'azzam Shah
Loyalty to Sultan 'Abdu'l Halim Mu'azzam Shah